Polly Ellen Trottenberg (born March 16, 1964) is an American politician and government official who is serving as Deputy Secretary of Transportation under Pete Buttigieg since April 14, 2021. She previously served as commissioner of the New York City Department of Transportation from 2014 to 2020.

Early life and education 
Trottenberg was born in Boston and grew up in Pelham, New York and Cambridge, Massachusetts. She earned a Bachelor of Arts degree in history from Barnard College in 1986 and a Master of Public Policy from the John F. Kennedy School of Government.

Career

Early career 
During the Obama administration, Trottenberg was the Under Secretary of Transportation for Policy, helping develop the Transportation Investment Generating Economic Recovery grant program.

Trottenberg also served as a transportation policy adviser for Senators Chuck Schumer, Barbara Boxer, and Daniel Patrick Moynihan, in addition to holding positions with the Port Authority of New York and New Jersey and the nonprofit Building America's Future.

NYC DOT

Polly Trottenberg was appointed by New York City Mayor Bill de Blasio on December 31, 2013, to replace Janette Sadik-Khan as Commissioner of the New York City Department of Transportation. Trottenberg was sworn in on January 27, 2014.

Trottenberg was also a board member of the Metropolitan Transportation Authority, having been confirmed for a 10-year term on June 23, 2014. Seen as a voice of "sanity" on the board, she resigned from the position on June 3, 2019. Trottenberg also served as the chair of TRANSCOM, a coalition of 16 transportation-related agencies in the New York metropolitan area, from 2015 to 2019.

Deputy Secretary of Transportation 

In November 2020, Trottenberg was named a volunteer member of the Joe Biden presidential transition Agency Review Team to support transition efforts related to the United States Department of Transportation. On January 18, 2021, it was announced that Trottenberg would serve as United States Deputy Secretary of Transportation in the incoming Biden administration.  On February 13, 2021, her nomination was formally submitted to the Senate for confirmation. On April 13, 2021, Trottenberg was confirmed in a 82–15 vote. She was sworn into office on April 14, 2021.

Personal life 
Trottenberg is Jewish. She lives on Capitol Hill with husband Mark Zuckerman, president of The Century Foundation.

References

External links

1964 births
Living people
21st-century American women politicians
21st-century American politicians
20th-century American Jews
Barnard College alumni
Biden administration personnel
Commissioners in New York City
Harvard Kennedy School alumni
New York (state) Democrats
Obama administration personnel
United States Department of Transportation officials
United States Deputy Secretaries of Transportation
Women government officials
Women in New York (state) politics
21st-century American Jews